This is a list of rivers in Ghana. This list is arranged  by drainage basin, with respective tributaries indented under each larger stream's name.

Ghana 

Bia River
Tano River
Nini River
Ankobra River
Pra River
Ofin River
Birim River 
Anum River
Ayensu River
Densu River

Volta River
Angongwi
Todzie River
Lake Volta
Afram River
River Asukawkaw
Oti River
Mo River
Atakora River
Sene River
Daka River
Pru River
Black Volta (Mouhoun River)
Tain River
White Volta (Nakambé)
Kulpawn River
Sisili River
Red Volta (Nazinon)

See also 

 Geography of Ghana

References

Central Intelligence Agency, 2007
 Rivers and Lakes of Ghana Countries Studies, U.S. Library of Congress, Accessed 2010-07-04
 GEOnet Names Server

Ghana
Lists of landforms of Ghana